Flemming Nielsen (16 July 1954 – 23 June 2018) was a Danish footballer. He was a right-back and played for OKS, Odense Boldklub, Fortuna Köln, South China FC, AaB and Aalborg Freja.

He played two matches for Denmark's U-21 national team in 1976 and five matches for their national team in 1978–79.

After his professional career, he was a coach for B1909 and FC Nordjylland as well as assistant coach and sports manager for the Viborg FF.

Until his death, he was talent manager and U18 coach for the women's team Fortuna Hjørring, where he had previously been head coach of the club's first team from 2007 to 2011. He was also a coach at Nordjyllands Sportscollege.

References

External links
 
 

1954 births
2018 deaths
Danish men's footballers
Association football fullbacks
Denmark international footballers
Denmark youth international footballers
Denmark under-21 international footballers
2. Bundesliga players
Odense Boldklub players
SC Fortuna Köln players
South China AA players
AaB Fodbold players
Danish football managers
Boldklubben 1909 managers
Danish expatriate men's footballers
Danish expatriate sportspeople in Germany
Expatriate footballers in Germany
Danish expatriate sportspeople in China
Expatriate footballers in China